Left Behind: The Kids (stylized as LEFT BEHIND >THE KIDS<) is a series of young adult speculative fiction novellas based on the Left Behind series, published by Tyndale House from 1998 to 2005. Written by Jerry B. Jenkins, Tim LaHaye, with uncredited contributions from Chris Fabry. The Kids follows a group of young Christians as they experience the Rapture and Great Tribulation.

The novellas contain elements of science fiction, science fantasy, utopian and dystopian fiction, mystery, and horror, woven within an evangelical narrative.

Dramatizations of the novellas were produced for Christian radio by EarFlix. The series was conceived as a sequence of 48 novellas, but only forty were published.

A film based around the first book in the 40 book series, titled "Vanished - Left Behind: The Next Generation" was released in 2016 to negative reviews by critics.

Characters 

 Judd Thompson Jr. — On the night on the Rapture, Judd had run away using his father's credit card to book a flight to London.
Vicki Byrne Thompson — Vicki grew up in a trailer park, and hated it because people regularly made fun of her and her family by calling them "Trailer Trash".
 Lionel Washington — Lionel is the only character to also appear in the main Left Behind novels.
 Ryan Daley — Initially a non-believer, he was the last of the four main characters to join the Tribulation Force.

The Kids (1998–2004) 
Left Behind: The Kids was published in paperback format. Turtleback Books released library binding editions.

The Young Trib Force (2003–2005) 
Left Behind: The Young Trib Force collections contain three or four novellas each. New material written by Chris Fabry linking each collection to a novel in the main series is also included. Several collections include extensive corrections to the original text intended to resolve inconsistent character and place names, and inconsistent dates and times.

References 

Left Behind series
Book series introduced in 1998
Young adult novel series
American young adult novels
Christian children's books
Novels by Jerry B. Jenkins
Novels by Tim LaHaye